Nguyễn Rogerio (born as Rogerio Machado Pereira; born 8 June 1979 in Brazil) is a Brazilian-born retired Vietnamese professional footballer.

References

Brazilian footballers
Living people
1979 births
Association football midfielders
SHB Da Nang FC players
Xuan Thanh Saigon Cement FC players
Thanh Hóa FC players
Footballers from Brasília
Vietnamese footballers